V-Guard Industries Ltd, is an Indian electricals and home appliances manufacturer, headquartered in Kochi and the largest in the state of Kerala with an annual turnover of  billion ( million) in financial year 2017–18. The company manufactures voltage stabilizers, electrical cable, electric pumps, electric motors, geysers, solar water heaters, electric fans and UPSs. It was founded in 1977 by Kochouseph Chittilappilly as a small voltage stabilizer manufacturing unit.

Kochouseph Chittilappilly also founded other establishments held as subsidiaries such as V-Star Creations, an Indian manufacturer of innerwear for men, women, and children, and Wonderla, a chain of amusement parks in South India.

History
V-Guard is a consumer goods company with diversified product offerings. Headquartered in the city of Kochi, Kerala, the company has over 500 distributors, 40,000 retailers and 31 branches across India as of March 2019. It is listed with the NSE and BSE since 2008. Over the years V-Guard has sold into domestic, industrial and agricultural electronic goods and appliances category taking the total company revenue to over  crore in 2016–17

The Kangaroo logo was created by artist V. A. Sreekandan (Mani).

The company's current managing director, Mithun Chittilappilly is a Post Graduate in Management from the University Of Melbourne, Australia. In the year 2006, he joined V-Guard as the executive director and in 2012, he was appointed as the managing director of the company. Mithun Chittilappilly has previously worked with leading MNCs like Deloitte & Hewlett Packard.

Chairman and founder, Kochouseph Chittilappilly was born in 1950 in Thrissur, Kerala, into a family traditionally engaged in agriculture. He holds a master's degree in Physics and began his career as a Supervisor in an electronics company. He is one of the founder promoters and was also the acting managing director of the company till in April 2012, he passed the baton on to his son Mithun Chittilappilly.

References

External links

Companies based in Kochi
Manufacturing companies established in 1977
Indian brands
Home appliance manufacturers of India
Wire and cable manufacturers
1977 establishments in Kerala
Indian companies established in 1977
Companies listed on the National Stock Exchange of India
Companies listed on the Bombay Stock Exchange